Arianna Martina Bergamaschi (born November 11, 1975), also known mononymously as Arianna, is an Italian singer, songwriter, stage actress and television presenter. She began her career when she was 7 years old, she started participating in numerous ad campaigns, and while still very young, participated in the TV shows "Fantastico 2" and "Fantastico 3", and in the 1989 Rai drama "I Promessi Sposi" (The Betrothed) and began studying dance with duo Brian and Garrison.

On February 1, 2013, Arianna released her hit single "Sexy People" which featured American rapper Pitbull.

Career

Career beginnings
In 1990 she was chosen among two thousand girls, as testimonial singer for Disney Italy.
The big American company had her sign a five years contract and record 4 solo albums (containing both the Disney classics, and unreleased songs) and dozens of compilations.

During this period, numerous services and interviews are dedicated to her on the weekly magazine "Topolino" (Mickey Mouse, where she had her own column: Il Filo di Arianna, i.e. The Ariadne's Thread) and other Disney titles (especially those dedicated to girls), and she is a guest on numerous teenagers TV shows (Big, Disney club, ...) but not only (Fantastico 1990, 1991, "Domenica In", "Telethon", "Piacere RAI Uno", "Superclassifica Show "...).

In 1991 she hosted "Cinema Insieme", a short TV show on air in the early evening before the RAI Uno films for the family and connected to a contest of the weekly Magazine Topolino. Also in 1991 she hosted a radio show on Radio 105 on Sundays morning.

In 1992 she was one of the RAI correspondents for The Grand Opening of Euro Disney. In 1995 she hosted the show "Canta con noi" on Junior TV.

In 1996 joined an acting course and two years later Gino Landi and Pietro Garinei chooses her to be partner of Maurizio Micheli in the musical "Un mandarino per Teo" (A tangerine for Teo). She works for that musical until 2000 when she enters the famous Sistina theater.

In 1998 participated in Newcomers' section of  Sanremo Festival, placed third, and in 1999 participates in the main section of Sanremo Festival placed fourth and recording the album "Arianna" with RTI music recording.

Later career
From 1998 until now she has been protagonist of a number of musicals as "Il mago di Oz" (Wizard of Oz) in 2000–2001, "Pinocchio" in 2003–2004 and "Masaniello" where she acted and sung in Neapolitan.
In 2006–2009 she also played as a prose actress for works as 2001/2 "Sogno di Una Notte di Mezza Estate" (A Midsummer Night Dream) and "La Bisbetica Domata" (The Taming of the Shrew) and finally as Juliet – replacing Martina Stella in just four days – in 2006 "Romeo e Giulietta" (Romeo and Juliet).

In 2000 she sang for the Jubilee in Piazza San Pietro attending Pope John Paul II and 350.000 people. The performance was aired worldwide. In 2000 performed the credit and end titles song for the RAI TV series "Una donna per amico 2" (A woman as a friend 2) where she also plays a role in the second episode.

In 2007 she has been the lead show-girl of Canale 5 La Corrida's most followed edition of last 10 years, dancing and singing live every Saturday, accompanied by Master Pregadio and 16 dancers. In June 2007 her last CD 'A modo mio' (My way), completely self-produced and distributed by EDEL, has been released. It features the most famous songs from world's most famous musicals re-arranged in pop, lounge, dance, Latino and rock styles, where lyrics have been re-written in Italian by Arianna herself.

In May 2008 she was chosen by Oscar Awarded Ennnio Morricone to sing the unpublished song "Verso Est" (Go West), written and arranged by Morricone himself. The song has been used as music background for the commercial of Lancia Delta starring Richard Gere. From September 2008 through March 2009 she has played as comedian in the TV show "Saturday Night Live" aired on Italia 1 and from February through May 2009 she has played, as Roberta di Leo, in the soap opera "Cento Vetrine" (A hundred windows) aired daily on Canale 5.

In May 2009 Arianna was chosen after 6 months auditions and among 2000 other contestants to play the role of Belle in the musical Beauty and the Beast, produced by musical production European leader company Stage Entertainment. The show is staged in the renewed Teatro Nazionale di Milano starting October 2, 2009.

Discography

Albums
1990 Siamo Forti
1991 T come teen-agers
1993 Bella non-lo sa
1994 Arianna canta Disney
1999 Arianna
2003 Pinocchio il grande musical 
2007  A modo mio
2011 Il fantastico mondo di Fantaghirò

Singles

Theatrical performances
Un mandarino per Teo 1998/1999 e 1999/2000, main female character, musical comedy by Pietro Garinei and Sandro Giovannini with Maurizio Micheli, direction by Gino Landi
Un viaggio d'amore (2000 e 2003), main female character with Michele Placido
Il mago di Oz 2000/2001, as Dorothy, directed by F. Crivelli
Sogno di una notte di mezza estate (2001, 2002 e 2003), co-starring role as Ermia, direction by Tato Russo
La bisbetica domata (2002) Summer Tour, as Bianca, direction by Alessandro Capone
Pinocchio (2003 e 2004), as The Blue Fairy, direction by Saverio Marconi with music and lyrics by Pooh.
Romeo e Giulietta (2006), as Juliet, direction by M. Panici
Masaniello (2006, 2007, 2008, 2009), main female character as Bernardina, direction by Tato Russo
La Bella e la Bestia 2009/2010 and 2010/2011, as Belle, direction by Glenn Casale
Tre cuori in affitto (2011/2012) with Paolo Ruffini, starring as Janet. Direction by Claudio Insegno
Aggiungi un posto a tavola (2013/2014) by Garinei and Giovannini in the role of Clementina. Direction by Fabrizio Angelini
– "Best of Musical" (2014/2015) gala concert with the most important songs from the Stage Entertainment musicals productions. Direction by Chiara Noschese

– "Murder Ballad" (2016) United States Musical theatre debut at the Detroit PublicTheatre in the main character of Sara. Direction by Courtney Burkett.

References

1975 births
Living people
Italian actresses
Singers from Milan
21st-century Italian singers
21st-century Italian women singers